Juliette Ramel (born 12 April 1987) is a Swedish Olympic dressage rider. Representing Sweden, she competed at the 2016 Summer Olympics in Rio de Janeiro where she finished 28th in the individual and 5th in the team competition. At the European Championships in Rotterdam 2019 she won team bronze together with her older sister Antonia Ramel.

References

Living people
1987 births
Swedish female equestrians
Swedish dressage riders
Equestrians at the 2016 Summer Olympics
Equestrians at the 2020 Summer Olympics
Olympic equestrians of Sweden

Juliette